Gilbert John Mendonca (born 9 October 1952) is an Indian politician from the state of Maharashtra. Mendonca was a one-term member of the Maharashtra Legislative Assembly, being a member of the 12th Assembly and serving in the lower house from 2009 to 2014.

Political life
Gilbert John Mendonca was born in Bhayandar, a suburb of Maharashtra, India. His family belongs to Christian Community and he had a business background. He entered politics in 1978, winning the post of sarpanch of Mira-Bhayandar. He went on to be elected president of Mira-Bhayandar in 1990 and was elected to the Maharashtra Legislative Assembly (MLA) on a Nationalist Congress Party ticket in 2009, representing the Mira Bhayandar (Vidhan Sabha constituency). Mendonca ran in the election against Narendra Mehta of the Bharatiya Janata Party and Chandrakant Vaita of the Maharashtra Navnirman Sena party. Of the 147,584 votes cast, Mendonca received 62,013, Mehta received 51,407, and Vaiti received 27,220 votes. Mendonca's margin of victory was 10,606 votes. Mendonca's candidacy was aided by the residents of Uttan, who protested against the relocation of a dumping ground to their town by refusing to allow any candidate to campaign there except Mendonca, who considered Uttan his "stronghold".

Mendonca was the first member of the MLA elected from Mira-Bhayandar. In 2011 he was credited with starting a drive to start local trains from the Mira Road railway station.

In the 2014 Maharashtra Legislative Assembly election, he lost to Mehta by about 30,000 votes.

Arrest
In July 2016, Mendonca was arrested for allegedly participating in a land grabbing case. The land was said to be worth hundreds of crores and a case of alleged cheating and land-grabbing was registered against him and four others. Mendonca spent nine months in jail and was released on bail in May 2017.

Disgruntled with the Nationalist Congress Party, he joined the Shiv Sena and was the face of the Mira-Bhayandar Municipal Corporation elections in 2017.

Personal life
Mendonca was married to Myra Mendonca (d. 2014), who was the first mayor of the Mira-Bhayandar Municipal Corporation. The couple had two children: a son, Venture Mendonca, who is a Municipal Corporator in Mira-Bhayandar Municipal Corporation, and a daughter, Caitlin Pereira, who served as mayor of Mira-Bhayandar Municipal Corporation from 2012 to 2017.

References

1952 births
Living people
Members of the Maharashtra Legislative Assembly
Shiv Sena politicians
Nationalist Congress Party politicians from Maharashtra